Seven Two may refer to:

 "Seven Two", song from the album Barragán by the rock band Blonde Redhead
 72 (number)
 7two, Australian television channel from the Seven Network
 72, the Alexander–Briggs notation of a twist knot with five half-twists